The 2018 Metro Atlantic Athletic Conference women's basketball tournament was held March 1–5 at the Times Union Center in Albany, New York. Quinnipiac received an automatic trip to the 2018 Women's NCAA tournament.

Seeds
Teams are seeded by conference record, with a ties broken by record between the tied teams followed by record against the regular-season champion, if record against regular season champion is tied, the tie breaker moves on to the regular season second place team, then third place team, etc.

Schedule

Bracket

 All times are Eastern.

See also
 Metro Atlantic Athletic Conference
 MAAC women's basketball tournament
 2018 MAAC men's basketball tournament

References

External links
2018 MAAC Women's Basketball Championship

MAAC women's basketball tournament
Tournament
MAAC women's basketball tournament
MAAC women's basketball tournament
Women's sports in New York (state)
College basketball tournaments in New York (state)
Basketball competitions in Albany, New York